The Slovenian Ground Force is the primary component of  Slovenian Armed Forces.

History
The current Slovenian Armed Forces are descended from the Territorial Defense of the Republic of Slovenia (Teritorialna Obramba Republike Slovenije; TORS), which was formed in 1968 as a paramilitary complement to the regular army of the former Yugoslav within the territory of Slovenia. The main objectives of TORS were to support the Yugoslav National Army (JNA) and conduct guerrilla operations in the event of an invasion.

When Slovenia declared independence at the onset of the Yugoslav Wars in 1991, the TORS and the Slovenian police comprised the majority of forces engaging the Yugoslav People's Army during the Ten-Day War.  The Slovenian Armed Forces were formally established in 1993 as a reorganization of the TORS.

Equipment

Infantry

Small arms

Artillery

Tanks, infantry fighting vehicles and armoured personnel carriers

Other vehicles

Stored equipment
 10× 9M111 Fagot anti-tank guided missile
 18× M2A1 105 mm towed howitzer
 8× 2S1 Gvozdika 122 mm self-propelled howitzer
 9× Roland II surface-to-air missile (2 units reportedly still in use with Cerklje ob Krki Airport air defense, rest stored with missiles demolished)
 5× BRDM-2 (reportedly used by command company of 44th Armored-mechanized Battalion "Wolves")
 Large quantities of M69 mortar and M57 Mortar, some used by reserve forces.

Former equipment

 9K11 Malyutka anti-tank guided missile
 6×  Strela 1M
 12× BOV 3
 12×  ZSU-57-2
 30× M48B1 76 mm towed gun
 4× M-63 Plamen Multiple rocket launcher system
 24× M53/59 Praga
 8×  PT 76B
 52x BVP M-80A - Slovenia donated 35 BVP M-80As to Ukraine in June 2022, some in Pivka museum
 30x M-55S - Slovenia donated 28 M55S to Ukraine, 1 sold to Bangladesh, 1 in Pivka museum

References

Military of Slovenia